SIPEX may refer to:
Sea Ice Physics and Ecosystem eXperiment
Sixth International Philatelic Exhibition held in Washington, D.C.